Eroll Zejnullahu (born 19 October 1994) is a Kosovan professional footballer who plays as a attacking midfielder for  club SpVgg Bayreuth and the Kosovo national team.

Club career

Youth career
Zejnullahu began his youth career at local side Tasmania Berlin. In 2011, he then moved to Hertha Zehlendorf.

Union Berlin
On 1 July 2012. Zejnullahu signed to Union Berlin's under-19 team. In 2012, he made his debut with Union Berlin II. On 1 February 2013, he made his debut with the first team in a 2. Bundesliga match against Sandhausen coming on as a substitute in the 89th minute in place of Michael Parensen.

Loan to Sandhausen
On 18 June 2017, Zejnullahu joined 2. Bundesliga side Sandhausen on loan, joining compatriot Leart Paqarada.

FC Carl Zeiss Jena
On 2 August 2019, Zejnullahu joined Carl Zeiss Jena on a free transfer until 2021.

FC Nitra
In January 2021, Zejnullahu joined Nitra.

Bayreuth
In June 2022, Zejnullahu signed with SpVgg Bayreuth.

International career
On 19 May 2014, Zejnullahu received a call-up from Kosovo for a friendly match against Turkey and Senegal and on 25 May 2014, he made his debut with Kosovo in a friendly match against Senegal replacing Albion Avdijaj in the 55th minute.

Career statistics

Club

International

References

External links
 

1994 births
Living people
Footballers from Berlin
Kosovan footballers
Kosovo international footballers
Kosovan expatriate footballers
German footballers
German people of Kosovan descent
Association football midfielders
1. FC Union Berlin players
SV Sandhausen players
FC Carl Zeiss Jena players
FC Nitra players
Berliner AK 07 players
SpVgg Bayreuth players
3. Liga players
2. Bundesliga players
Slovak Super Liga players
Expatriate footballers in Germany
Kosovan expatriate sportspeople in Germany
Expatriate footballers in Slovakia
Kosovan expatriate sportspeople in Slovakia